Elyakim Schlesinger born September 1921) of London is a rabbi and rosh yeshiva. He is an international authority and serves as the President, Chairman, and Head of the Rabbinical Board of the Committee for the Preservation of Jewish Cemeteries in Europe. He is a grandson of Moreinu Yaakov Rosenheim, one of the founders of Agudath Israel. He was born in Vienna in September 1921 and emigrated to Isreal with his family in the late 1930's. He is a son in law of Rabbi Moshe Blau. He was very close to Rabbi Yosef Tzvi Dushinsky, the Chazon Ish, and the Brisker Rav. Shortly sfter his marriage, in around 1947, he moved to London, England. He then opened a yeshiva named Yeshivas Rama and he still delivers lectures to its students. His wife died in 2019 after 74 years of marriage.

References 

Rabbis from London
Jews and Judaism in London
Living people
Place of birth missing (living people)
Year of birth missing (living people)